A public service announcement (PSA) is a message in the public interest disseminated by the media without charge to raise public awareness and change behavior.  In the UK, they are generally called a public information film (PIF); in Hong Kong, they are known as an announcement in the public interest (API).

History
The earliest public service announcements (in the form of moving pictures) were made before and during the Second World War years in both the UK and the US.

In the UK, amateur actor Richard Massingham set up Public Relationship Films Ltd in 1938 as a specialist agency for producing short educational films for the public. In the films, he typically played a bumbling character who was slightly more stupid than average and often explained the message of the film by demonstrating the risks if it was ignored. The films covered topics such as how to cross the road, how to prevent the spread of diseases, how to swim, and how to drive without causing the road to be unsafe for other users. During the war, he was commissioned by the Ministry of Information to produce films for the war effort. Massingham began to produce longer films, for both private companies and the Government, after the War.

In the US, the Ad Council (initially called the War Advertising Council) was set up in 1941, when America entered World War II. It began implementing on a massive scale the idea of using advertising to influence American society on a range of fronts. Its first campaigns focused on the country's needs during World War II, such as encouraging the American public to invest their savings in government bonds.

After the war, PSAs were used to educate the public on a broader range of issues. In the UK, they were produced for the Central Office of Information (COI), and again by private contractors, which were usually small film companies, such as Richard Taylor Cartoons. They were supplied to broadcasters free of charge for them to use at any time. Their utility as a cost-free means to fill the gaps in fixed-duration commercial breaks left by unsold advertising airtime led to their regular usage in the 60s, 70s, and much of the 80s, and consequently, within both the COI and broadcasting companies, they were typically known as "fillers". They are still being produced, although the vastly reduced need for broadcasters to turn to third-party filler material to deal with unused airtime during breaks or junctions means they are now only seen rarely.

In different countries

United States
The most common topics of PSAs are health and safety, such as the multimedia Emergency Preparedness & Safety Tips On Air and Online (talk radio/blog) campaign. A typical PSA is part of a public awareness campaign to inform or educate the public about an issue such as obesity or compulsive gambling.

One of the earliest television public service announcements came in the form of Smokey Bear whose "Only you can prevent forest fires" campaign ran for decades. Other common early themes were traffic safety, especially safe crossing, wearing seat belts and not driving drunk, and the dangers of cigarette smoking.

From time to time a charitable organization enlists the support of a celebrity for a PSA; examples include actress Kathryn Erbe telling people to be green and Crips gang leader Stanley Williams speaking from prison to urge youths not to join gangs or commit crimes.

Some television shows featuring very special episodes made PSAs after the episodes. For example, Law & Order: Special Victims Unit talked about child abduction in one episode, with a PSA about child abduction airing after the episode.  After My Sister Sam was canceled in 1988, surviving cast members: Pam Dawber, Joel Brooks, Jenny O'Hara and David Naughton were reunited to film a PSA for the Center to Prevent Handgun Violence on gun control after the murder of their co-star, Rebecca Schaeffer, who was gunned down by Robert John Bardo on July 18, 1989, at Schaeffer's apartment in Los Angeles.

During the 1980s, many American cartoon shows contained PSAs at the end of their shows. Examples include the closing moral segments at the end of He-Man and the Masters of the Universe, the "Knowing is Half the Battle" epilogues in G.I. Joe: A Real American Hero, Jem, M.A.S.K., Inspector Gadget, and the "Sonic Says" segments from Adventures of Sonic the Hedgehog.

South Korea 
PSAs in South Korea are produced by the Public Service Advertisement Council, an organization under the Korea Broadcasting Advertisement Corporation (KOBACO), launched on January 22, 1981. According to the law, PSAs above a certain level are being organized through broadcasting.

The Public Service Advertising Council, an organization within the KOBACO, is in charge of advisory roles such as selecting the topic of PSAs broadcast in Korea for one year, establishing public relations measures, and seeking strategies. This meeting originated from the 'Broadcasting Advertising Improvement Advisory Committee' formed on August 18, 1981, and after going through the 'Public Service Advertising Improvement Advisory Committee' on February 7, 1983, the name was changed to the current name on July 1, 1988. The names of external advertisements have been “Broadcasting Advertisement Improvement Council” and “Public Service Advertisement Council”. The Public Service Advertising Council is an organization made up of about 15 persons nominated by advertising academia, broadcasting, advertising, and civic groups.
As of 2020, there are a total of 400 PSAs produced by the KOBACO.

China 
China's first PSAs in 1986 were about saving water and were broadcast on Guiyang television. In Hong Kong, terrestrial television networks have been required since National Day 2004 to preface their main evening news broadcasts with a minute-long announcement in the public interest which plays the Chinese National Anthem in Mandarin over various patriotic montages.

Malaysia
Filem Negara Malaysia (FNM) became the early pioneers of PSAs from its establishment in 1946. PSAs produced by FNM have particular topics such as dengue fever, drug addiction, environmental pollution, road safety and electricity usage. Governmental agencies such as Ministry of Health have produced PSAs to promote their Healthy Lifestyle Campaign which held annually since 1991, with the "Utamakan Kesihatan" ("Choose Health") logo appearing at the end of their ads, most notably PSAs about AIDS.

PSAs on road safety were produced by Ministry of Transport, particularly on accidents amongst motorcyclists and alcohol consumption amongst drivers. Ministry of Science, Technology and the Environment also produces PSAs focusing on environmental pollution. PSAs on corruption and bribery were produced by Malaysian Anti-Corruption Agency (now Malaysian Anti-Corruption Commission). Most of these PSA adverts were aired on Radio Televisyen Malaysia (RTM) and TV Pendidikan between the 1990s and 2000s. Private TV networks like TV3 have also produced in-house PSA ads, covering topics such as not downloading pirated content, which features actress and infotainer, Janna Nick; and domestic violence which features actress, Eyra Hazali.

Festivals and contests
IAA Responsibility Awards is an annual international festival of public service announcements, held by the International Advertising Association since 2008.

See also 
 Public affairs (broadcasting)
 Public relations
 Public information film
 Propaganda
 Propaganda techniques

References

External links 

 PSA Research Center
 Ad Council
 PSAdirector
 Example PSAs
 A History of PSAs
 Military PSA campaigns
 A Huffington Post article featuring nine PSAs
 The International Advertising Association (IAA)

 
Communication design
Internet memes